Osees are an American rock band formed in San Francisco, California in 1997, now based in Los Angeles, California. The band currently consists of primary songwriter and core member John Dwyer (vocals, guitar), Tim Hellman (bass), Dan Rincon (drums), Paul Quattrone (drums) and Tomas Dolas (keyboards). Osees sound incorporates a wide range of rock genres, including 1960s garage rock and psychedelic rock, punk rock, noise rock, art punk, and 1980s post-punk.

Initially an outlet for Dwyer (Coachwhips, Pink and Brown and The Hospitals) to release experimental home recordings, Osees evolved into a full band, featuring Brigid Dawson (vocals, keyboard), Petey Dammit (bass, guitar), Mike Shoun (drums), and Lars Finberg (drums, guitar). Over the course of several releases and genre transitions, the band became noted for their prolific discography, energetic live shows, and whimsical visual aesthetic. The band has changed its lineup and name several times, having previously been known as Orinoka Crash Suite, OCS, Orange County Sound, The Ohsees, The Oh Sees, Thee Oh Sees, and Oh Sees.

In late 2013, it was announced that the band would be entering a hiatus. A new studio album, however, entitled Drop, was released in 2014, and Oh Sees subsequently toured as a three-piece, with Sic Alps bassist Tim Hellman and White Fence drummer Nick Murray replacing Dawson, Dammit!, and Shoun. In 2015, Dawson returned to the band, in a studio capacity, for its next studio album, Mutilator Defeated At Last. Following its release, Dwyer and Hellman began touring with two drummers, Ryan Moutinho and Dan Rincon, replacing Murray. Touring extensively, this line-up recorded the band's seventeenth and eighteenth studio albums, A Weird Exits and An Odd Entrances, with Moutinho departing in late 2016 to focus on his own projects.

With the arrival of new drummer Paul Quattrone, and an ever-increasing public profile, the band recorded its nineteenth album, Orc, with co-producers Ty Segall, Eric Bauer and Enrique Tena. In late 2017, Dwyer reunited with Dawson for a primarily acoustic album, Memory of a Cut Off Head, which returned to the band's lo-fi roots, and featured several former and current Oh Sees members.

After two studio albums featuring a heavy, progressive rock sound—Smote Reverser (2018) and Face Stabber (2019)—the band changed its name to Osees in July 2020, with the announcement of their twenty-third album, Protean Threat. The group continued to release prolifically under the new name, putting out Metamorphosed, alongside a remix album and an EP before the end of 2020. The band's twenty-sixth album, A Foul Form, was released on August 12, 2022.

History

Early years and solo recordings (1997–2004)
John Dwyer began releasing songs on compilation albums under the name Orinoka Crash Suite as early as 1997. Initially, OCS served as a solo project for Dwyer while he focused on his participation in other groups, including Pink and Brown, Zeigenbock Kopf, and Coachwhips.

The first album, simply titled 1, was released in 2003 by Tumult Records as the first full album under the OCS name. The first disc was based around acoustic songs, and was individually referred to as 34 Reasons Why Life Goes On Without You. The second disc was a series of "noise" tracks called 18 Reasons To Love Your Hater To Death. None of the songs on either disc have titles. The album's song credits are mostly attributed to John Dwyer, though three are credited to Jeff Rosenberg, who was the drummer under the pseudonym "Brown" in Pink and Brown. The album features several guest musicians, but no one who would continue on to the next album, entitled 2. The album was reissued on vinyl by No Coast Records for the first time in 2022.

2 was released in 2004 by Narnack Records, and was made in a similar fashion to 1, but with a greater focus on Dwyer as a solo performer.

First transitional period and lineup changes (2005–2007)
The band slowly transitioned from being Dwyer's side project into his primary group, as his other bands Coachwhips and Zeigenbock Kopf both disbanded during this period (2005 and 2006, respectively).

OCS became a two-piece with the addition of Patrick Mullins who played percussion and saw. The arrangements continued to be simple, though bolstered by the addition of Mullins. The project's third and fourth studio albums, Songs About Death & Dying Vol. 3 and OCS 4: Get Stoved were released as a two-CD set in 2005. 3 was available both as part of this set, and as an individual vinyl release. 4 did not see a vinyl issue until 2008.

Brigid Dawson was previously a member of the duo Mix Tape with Meric Long of The Dodos. She had been working in a coffee shop in San Francisco, and would frequently see Dwyer visit the shop and put up flyers for his upcoming shows. The two became fast friends, and Dwyer eventually asked Dawson to join the band after seeing one of her shows. Her role includes duet/backing vocals, keyboards, and tambourine. Dawson will occasionally perform lead vocals (in the cases of "Invitation" on Sucks Blood and "What Are We Craving?" on Castlemania).

As a trio, the band released The Cool Death of Island Raiders in 2006, their first release under the name The OhSees. The album was co-produced by TV on the Radio members Dave Sitek and Kyp Malone.

Petey Dammit! joined the group in 2007, as a bassist and occasionally second guitarist. Dammit was previously a member of the two-piece band Tres Ferocious. John Dwyer was familiar with the band's work, and asked him to join when he was looking to expand the lineup of The Ohsees. Dammit's bass playing uncharacteristically involves using an ordinary electric guitar that is fed through an electronic device that makes it sound like a bass guitar. His method of doing this is intentionally kept a secret. Dammit typically favors Fender Jazzmaster guitars for this task, but in Thee Hounds of Foggy Notion, he is also seen using a blue Italia Mondial without this manipulation, for songs that were not recorded with a bass guitar.

The album Sucks Blood followed in 2007. It would be the final studio album to feature Patrick Mullins, but he would appear later in the live DVD/album Thee Hounds Of Foggy Notion that was released in 2008. Mullins moved to Louisville, Kentucky and in 2010 he released a solo album called Don't Go To Sleep.

Jigmae Baer played for a year as the group's drummer after Mullins had left the band. He recorded with the band for their Tascam 388 recordings, as well as their sessions with Dave Sitek. His work can be heard on Sucks Blood, The Master's Bedroom is Worth Spending a Night In, and various 7" and 10"s releases during this period. Baer went on to play with Ty Segall in both his solo act and in The Perverts. Baer then founded the Royal Baths and currently is a founding member of LODRO.

Mike Shoun joined the band as the new drummer after Baer's departure. Shoun's arrival coincided with the band's change into a louder garage punk based sound.

Garage, psychedelia, and punk (2008–2013)
With the new four-piece lineup established, the scope of the band's music and success started to increase. The Master's Bedroom is Worth Spending a Night In was released in 2008, under the name Thee Oh Sees. This album is also notable for being the first collaboration with Chris Woodhouse, a mix engineer and guest musician who would continue to appear on the albums that followed. The band released their album Help in 2009. This was their first album released on In the Red Records, the label for most of their main releases up until 2013. The album, Dog Poison, was also released this year, an acoustic take on the newer, more upbeat sound of the band.

Warm Slime arrived in 2010,  following strongly in the footsteps of Help. The album's first side is dominated by the title track, with a running time of 13:30. The song's long format and repetitive structure foreshadowed the krautrock influence that would become a larger part of their sound in the new decade.

On April 28, 2011, Patrick Mullins rejoined the band for a one-off performance at the Cafe Du Nord in their hometown of San Francisco. The band played songs from the albums 4 through The Master's Bedroom is Worth Spending a Night In. Most of these songs had not been included in the setlists for some time.

The recording of 2011's Castlemania was solely undertaken by John Dwyer and Brigid Dawson and a series of other notable musicians. Petey Dammit and Mike Shoun would record on the year's latter album Carrion Crawler/The Dream along with new member Lars Finberg (from The Intelligence). Finberg joined as a full-time second drummer and second guitar player, but continues to lead and tour with The Intelligence. Dawson and Dwyer approached 2012's Putrifiers II in a similar manner as the group recorded Castlemania.

In 2011, the band's single "Tidal Wave" was featured in the Breaking Bad episode "Salud", where it plays over Gus Fring's poisoning of Don Eladio and his capos.

In 2013, "The Dream", from Carrion Crawler/The Dream was included in the soundtrack for the video game Grand Theft Auto V.

On April 16, 2013, The band released Floating Coffin. The album was released on Castle Face Records, a label that John Dwyer co-owns with Brian Lee Hughes and Matt Jones. The album was the first since The Master's Bedroom ...  to be self-released. Later that year, they released the Moon Sick EP, a collection of four songs from the Floating Coffin sessions that were excluded from the album. The EP was released as a benefit for Healthy San Francisco, a healthcare organization that had aided Dwyer and his friends over the years.

Second transitional period (2013–2015)
On December 18, 2013 during a show at San Francisco's Great American Music Hall, Dwyer announced to the crowd "This will be the last Oh Sees show for a long while. So dig in."

In an interview with SF Weekly, the band's tour manager Annie Southworth confirmed the news, noting that Dwyer was looking to take some time off as he made the move from San Francisco to Los Angeles. She added, "They need a break after 5 years straight, so yes ... hiatus time. Will be a little hard to continue with all the different locales so who knows what is going to happen ... Cross fingers, we all are that it's not completely over."

The statements led to rumors that the band was entering an indefinite hiatus, or breaking up. On December 20, 2013, the band cleared the rumors by posting on their official site that a new LP will be coming in early 2014, and "we will see where the live shows go from there." On February 12, it was announced that the album, entitled Drop, would be released on April 19 through Castle Face Records. It was created by John Dwyer and Chris Woodhouse, similar to the creation of previous Thee Oh Sees albums like Putrifiers II, Dog Poison, and Castlemania.

Brigid Dawson relocated to San Marin, CA, where she continues to paint and exhibit artwork. Mike Shoun & Petey Dammit have remained in the Bay Area. Dammit appeared as the bassist on Dylan Shearer's Empty Cellar Records/Castle Face release garagearray, released on April 15, 2014. In 2014, Dammit joined former member Lars Finberg's band, The Intelligence.

Since the dispersal of the band members, the band's live performances have been as a trio, with drummer Nick Murray, and bassist Timothy Hellman. Brigid Dawson's roles as a vocalist and keyboardist have not been filled. John Dwyer explained the reason for the latter in an interview with Uncut magazine: "The future of the band doesn't hold much keyboard, I want to go more guitar. I'll still record with a keyboard but I'm burned out with it live. I've been getting trapped into synthesizer land, I'm just surrounded by drum machines and keyboards while all my rock and roll stuff is in another studio." Brooklyn Vegan noted that while the band is currently touring as a trio, this should not be considered a permanent, "official" lineup change.

In 2015, however, the new line-up of the band entered the studio to record its fourteenth studio album, Mutilator Defeated At Last, with Brigid Dawson returning to the band as its backing vocalist. Following the album's release, drummers Ryan Moutinho and notable Elon Musk impersonator Dan Rincon joined both Dwyer and Hellman in the band's live line-up. In 2019, the album came at no.23 on Happy Mag's "25 Best Psychedelic Rock Albums of The 2010s" with high praise of the albums "textured density." In February 2016, the band released a stand-alone single from the album's sessions, entitled "Fortress", and announced a live album, Live in San Francisco, from its accompanying tour, which was released on July 1, 2016.

Name changed to Oh Sees and prolific output (2016–2019)
With the core line-up solidifying into the four-piece of Dwyer, Hellman, Moutinho and Rincon, the band toured extensively, releasing a new single, "Plastic Plant", alongside an announcement that they'd be releasing a new album entitled A Weird Exits on August 12 of that year. A second album recorded during the same sessions, An Odd Entrances, was released on  November 18, 2016. Two days prior to its release, Ryan Moutinho departed from the band, stating: "I'm not here to list reasons as they are personal and the list would be far too long. ... Thank you for coming to the shows and giving every ounce of energy to us. I promise I tried my very best to give it back in return. I don't see this as closing old doors but opening new ones."  In January 2017, drummer Paul Quattrone (!!!, Modey Lemon) joined the band onstage for two benefit shows at the Teragram Ballroom, Los Angeles.

On June 7, 2017, Dwyer announced the name of the band has changed to Oh Sees and released a track entitled "The Static God" from their upcoming record Orc, which was released on August 25, 2017.

Three days after Orcs release, Dwyer announced that the title of the band had yet again changed back to the original moniker of OCS, and released the track "Memory of a Cut Off Head" from the album of the same name, due out November 17, as the 100th record on Castle Face. The band made it clear that this was a one time name for this album only, and returned to the lineup of Dwyer and Dawson, as well as returning to their original hushed sound. On December 28, 2017, the band announced the return to the name Oh Sees along with a new EP, Dead Medic, consisting of two long tracks from the Orc sessions, including a cover of "A Few Days of Reflection" by the Swedish Band Träd, Gräs, och Stenar

The band released a track entitled "Overthrown" on May 21, 2018, from their record Smote Reverser, which was released on August 17, 2018. In addition, the band announced an expansion to their on-going tour.

The band released a 21-minute track titled "Henchlock" on June 25, 2019, from their record Face Stabber, which was released on August 16, 2019.

Osees (2019–present)

On November 23, 2019, the band released The 12" Synth including two 20-minute tracks on the YouTube channel of Castleface Records, under the name of "Osees". The album was made available on Spotify after a few weeks, December 10, 2019.

The band released its first full-length studio album under the Osees name, Protean Threat, on September 18, 2020. A week later, on September 26th, the band released a streamed live performance with Levitation. The full performance was later uploaded to the Levitation YouTube channel in 2021. A month later, the band released Metamorphosed on October 16th, which featured a few leftover songs from the production of Face Stabber, as well as two longer tracks. The band closed off the year releasing Panther Rotate, a "companion LP [to Protean Threat] of remixes, field recordings, and sonic experiments", as well as Weirdo Hairdo, an EP featuring a cover of The Spiders' "Don't Blow Your Mind". On December 19th, Osees released another streamed live performance where they performed covers of Black Flag, Liket Lever, and Faust songs, as well as a good bunch of their own.

The band released their latest studio album, A Foul Form on August 12, 2022.

Philosophy
In a September 2012 interview with New York Music News, Petey Dammit explained the band's philosophy on recording:

Members

Current
John Dwyer – lead vocals, guitar, keyboards, flute (1997–present)
Tim Hellman – bass guitar (2014–present)
Dan Rincon – drums, sampler (2015–present)
Paul Quattrone – drums (2017–present)
Tomas Dolas – keyboards, occasional guitar (2018–present)

Current studio contributors
Brigid Dawson – backing vocals (2015–present)

Former
Brigid Dawson – keyboards, percussion, backing vocals (2005–2013, 2015, 2017)
Petey Dammit – bass guitar, (2006–2013)
Patrick Mullins – drums, electronics, singing saw (2004–2006)
Jigmae Baer – drums (2006–2007)
Mike Shoun – drums (2007-2013)
Chris Owens – percussion, backing vocals (2008, live performances only)
Lars Finberg – drums, guitar, backing vocals (2011–2012)
Nick Murray – drums (2014–2015)
Ryan Moutinho – drums (2015–2016)

Former studio contributors
Chris Woodhouse – various instruments, recording engineer (2008–2016)

Timeline

Discography

Released as OCS
1 (2003)
2 (2004)
Songs About Death & Dying Vol. 3 (2005)
OCS 4: Get Stoved (2005)
Memory of a Cut Off Head (2017)

Released as The Ohsees
The Cool Death of Island Raiders (2006)
Released as The Oh Sees
Sucks Blood (2007)

Released as Thee Oh Sees
The Master's Bedroom Is Worth Spending a Night In (2008)
Help (2009)
Dog Poison (2009)
Warm Slime (2010)
Castlemania (2011)
Carrion Crawler/The Dream (2011)
Putrifiers II (2012)
Floating Coffin (2013)
Drop (2014)
Mutilator Defeated at Last (2015)
A Weird Exits (2016)
An Odd Entrances (2016)

Released as Oh Sees
Orc (2017)
Smote Reverser (2018)
Face Stabber (2019)

Released as Osees
Protean Threat (2020)
Metamorphosed (2020)
A Foul Form (2022)

References

External links
Official website
2010 Thee Oh Sees Interview at Bandega.com
Sept 2008 Interview with L.A. Record
Interview with John Dwyer
Thee Oh Sees at the Free Music Archive
In The Red Records Artist Page

Alternative rock groups from California
American experimental musical groups
Garage rock groups from California
American noise rock music groups
Musical groups from San Francisco
Neo-psychedelia groups
Post-punk revival music groups
Punk rock groups from California
Musical groups established in 1997
Tumult Records artists
In the Red artists
Load Records artists
Narnack Records artists